The 2013 FFV State Knockout Cup was the third edition of a football (soccer) knockout-cup competition held between men's clubs in Victoria, Australia in 2013, the annual edition of the Dockerty Cup. The first round was played during the weekend of 3 March 2013, with the Final scheduled for 7 September.

Unlike previous years, this tournament does not stagger the entrance of teams based on their position on the football pyramid; teams from as high as the Victorian Premier League participated in the opening round, though 16 selected clubs were given byes to the Fourth Round.

Format

During Rounds 1–4, the matches will be played within 4 geographical "zones" (North, South, East and West), with the zones merging into a single competition in Round 5.

Round 1
50 Clubs were randomly granted byes into Round 2; the remaining 28 of the introductory teams played in Round 1 on the weekend of 2 March. The Draw for this round was held on 15 February.

North Zone

East Zone

South Zone

West Zone

Round 2
These matches were played during the weekend of 9 March. The Draw for this round was held on 15 February, the same day as the Draw for Round 1.

North Zone

East Zone

South Zone

West Zone

Round 3
These matches were played on the weekend of 23 March; the Draw was held on 12 March.

North Zone

East Zone

South Zone

West Zone

Round 4

Round 4 saw the introduction of 16 Seeded Clubs, selected based on their performance in the 2012 FFV State Knockout Cup.

Clubs Entering
North Zone
 Pascoe Vale
 Moreland Zebras
 Heidelberg United
 Northcote City

East Zone
 Oakleigh Cannons
 South Melbourne
 Port Melbourne Sharks
 Richmond Eagles

South Zone
 Dandenong Thunder
 Southern Stars
 Bentleigh Greens
 Werribee City

West Zone
 Green Gully Cavaliers
 Melbourne Knights
 North Geelong Warriors
 Altona Magic

The Round 4 matches were played on the weekend of 4 May; the Draw was held on 25 March.

North Zone

East Zone

South Zone

West Zone

Round 5
This round saw the 4 winners from each Zone in the previous round enter a single 16-Club draw. These matches were played on the weekend of 8 June; the Draw took place on 6 May.

Quarter-finals
The Draw for the quarter-finals took place on 12 June; the matches took place on 23 July.

Semi-finals
The Draw for the semi-finals took place on 15 July.

Final
The Final was played at the neutral venue of Knights Stadium on 8 September.

Notes

References

Soccer cup competitions in Australia
Soccer in Victoria (Australia)